Gugjeh (also Romanized as Gūgjeh and Gowgjeh; also known as Gogjeh, Gowg Tappeh, and Gowjeh) is a village in Sarshiv Rural District, Sarshiv District, Marivan County, Kurdistan Province, Iran. In 2006 census, its population was 383, in 74 families. The village is populated by Kurds.

References 

Towns and villages in Marivan County
Kurdish settlements in Kurdistan Province